A Rage Against Heaven is a 1978 historical novel written by Fred Mustard Stewart, and published by Viking Press. The story spans the American Civil War, starting with South Carolina's secession from the Union in the first chapter.

Characters

Louis "Lew" Crandall - The protagonist, son of Judge Jefferson Crandall. At the beginning, he was attending Princeton University, majoring in medicine.
Elizabeth Crandall (née Butterfield) - Lew's wife.
Ben Bramwell - Lew's best friend. One quarter Jewish on his father's side. He has a strong sexual interest in prepubescent girls.
Nicole Louise Crandall - Lew's mother, a French woman.
Jethro - Ben's servant, a Negro.
Christine - A twelve-year-old mulatto girl won in a poker game by Harvey Winkler.
Harvey Winkler - A man who had won Christine in a card game, though he initially claimed that she was his daughter. He was spending the night at Ben's house and was killed by Lew in self-defense.
Deborah Butterfield - Elizabeth's younger sister.

References

1978 American novels
American historical novels
Novels by Fred Mustard Stewart